Georgia's 7th State Senate district is located in Ocilla, Georgia. Its current representative is Tyler Harper.

District Office Holder
Greg Goggans January 10, 2005 – January 14, 2013 — Republican
Tyler Harper January 14, 2013 – Present — Republican

External links
http://www.senate.ga.gov/senators/en-US/district.aspx?District=7&Session=27

Government of Georgia (U.S. state)
Georgia Senate districts